Ramie Leahy is an Irish artist  and a co-founder of Ireland's first international arts festival, Kilkenny Arts Festival. One of the group of Kilkenny Colourists, a group he founded with his peers Francis Tansey and Tony O'Malley, he has been described as an impressionist and a surrealist, whose works range from landscapes to political satire and natural history studies.

Early life

Ramie Leahy was born on August 28, 1950, in Kilkenny, Ireland. He was brought up on a farm outside Kilkenny City, one of four children.  His father died when he was aged seven and he was raised by his mother, a local school teacher and intellectual; she entertained a series of poets, writers and intellectuals of the period at their home in Deerpark, Kilkenny. She was also responsible for taking him to visit the galleries of Dublin, London, and Paris as a young child, where he has said he first saw Turner and the French Impressionists, and his artistic leanings began.

He attended primary school at Loreto and then St. Kieran's College. Here Leahy combined a rebellious streak with an after-school occupation of promoting concerts of 1960s pop acts like Thin Lizzy, Them, and Granny's Intentions caused some friction with the clergy.

After finishing school in Kilkenny, he began a tour of art colleges including Limerick School of Art where he studied painting, drawing and sculpture, the National College of Art, Dún Laoghaire College of Art and Trinity College Dublin.

He was awarded a scholarship to study on a Unesco course of museum science and visual communication in Florence, Italy.

Subsequently, he studied architecture at the Dublin Institute of Technology Dublin.

College Years and Florence

While in Florence, Leahy worked on a series of political works about the Troubles in Northern Ireland, the first of many series with a political theme.

His tutor, the former director of the Uffizi Gallery in Florence, Luisa Becherucci, described his use of form. She noted his work was “serene and poetic above any conformist pessimism” with a technique which “transpires not a wallowing in lugubrious degradation but a searching refinement with unusual notes of beauty”.

His use of form of colour was “rather a galaxy alive with light, with vivid flashings and disappearing glows, not residues of disintegrating worlds but rather a cosmic vibration of innovating forms”.

The series, which he describes as his ‘Black Period’ was included in the Exhibition of Living Art in the Project Arts Centre in Dublin in 1972.

Founding Kilkenny Arts Festival

In 1974 Leahy co-founded Ireland's first, and still most highly regarded, international arts festival, Kilkenny Arts Festival.

During this period, he was also involved with the Independent Artists Group a group of leading Irish artists including Cliona Cussen, Brid Ni Rinn, George and Justin Laffin, and worked as forward planner for Wexford Opera Festival.

George Berkeley, Philosophy and Dysart Castle

In 1977 Leahy acquired Dysart Castle and farm, the childhood home of Ireland's most famous philosopher George Berkeley, after whom the University of California is named. 
Leahy became an expert in Berkeley's early history and has lectured with the International Berkeley society in Rhode Island, where Berkeley lived in America.  
In 2008 he held a music concert at Dysart Castle with acts including John Martyn and Katherine Jenkins.

Artistic career

Leahy has specialized in the use of high intensity colour in all his artistic forms from landscapes to political satire and natural history studies.  He has variously been described as impressionist to surrealist in his extreme use of his mediums, primarily oil paints and watercolours. 
Through the 1980s he worked on a series of paintings exploring ancient cultures from Brittany through England to Ireland and Jersey.

Colourist movement in Kilkenny 1996

In 1996 Leahy and a group of high-profile artists with links to his hometown of Kilkenny founded the Kilkenny Colourists Movement.

Others in the group included Tony O’Malley and his wife Jane O’Malley, Francis Tansey, and other Irish impressionist artists whose work involved a particular focus on the use of colours. The group continued to exhibit together, usually during Kilkenny Arts Festival, during the late 1990s. Other members include Paula Minchin, Elizabeth Cope and Mick Mulcahy.

References

1950 births
Living people
20th-century Irish painters
21st-century Irish painters
Irish male painters
20th-century Irish male artists